Elias Lianos is a Greek businessman. He was the founder, CEO and major shareholder of Proton Bank, which is headquartered in Athens, Greece. He was also the president and owner of Panionios B.C., the Athens-based Greek Basket League club.

References

External links
 Panionios B.C. Website 
 Proton Bank  /

Year of birth missing (living people)
Living people
Greek businesspeople